Ophthalmitis is a genus of geometer moths in the Boarmiini tribe.

Description
All species have characteristic color patterns: the ground color is pale fawn, suffused or variegated with greenish brown. The fasciae are blackish and the discal spots likewise, prominent on each wing and usually enclosing an ellipse or a lunula of the ground color.

Palpi reaching vertex of head and fringed with hair in front. Antennae bipectinated (comb like on both sides) to near apex in both sexes, the branches longer in the male than female. Hind tibia not dilated. Forewings with a fovea in male. Apex rounded. Vein 3 from close to angle of cell. Veins 7 to 9 stalked from near upper angle. Vein 10 free and vein 11 given off from vein 12. Hindwing with vein 3 from close to angle of cell.

Species

Ophthalmitis abundantior Wehrli, 1943
Ophthalmitis albosignaria Bremer & Grey, 1853
Ophthalmitis basiscripta Holloway, 1993
Ophthalmitis caritaria Walker, 1860
Ophthalmitis clararia Walker, 1866
Ophthalmitis cordularia Swinhoe, 1893
Ophthalmitis cordularioides Holloway, 1993
Ophthalmitis diurnaria Guenée, 1858
Ophthalmitis episcia Wehrli, 1943
Ophthalmitis exemptaria Walker, 1860
Ophthalmitis fasciata Warren, 1900
Ophthalmitis hedemanni Christoph, 1880
Ophthalmitis herbidaria Guenée, 1857
Ophthalmitis hypophayla Wehrli, 1943
Ophthalmitis infusaria Walker, 1860
Ophthalmitis irrorataria Bremer & Grey, 1853
Ophthalmitis isorphnia Wehrli, 1943
Ophthalmitis juglandaria Oberthür, 1913
Ophthalmitis lectularia Swinhoe, 1891
Ophthalmitis mundata Walker, 1869
Ophthalmitis ocellata Leech, 1889
Ophthalmitis pertusaria Felder, 1874
Ophthalmitis poliaria Hampson, 1902
Ophthalmitis prasinospila Prout, 1916
Ophthalmitis pulsaria Swinhoe, 1891
Ophthalmitis punctifascia Holloway, 1976
Ophthalmitis ruficornis Warren, 1897
Ophthalmitis rufilauta Prout, 1925
Ophthalmitis satoi Holloway, 1993
Ophthalmitis saturniaria Graeser, 1888
Ophthalmitis senex Butler, 1878
Ophthalmitis sinensium Oberthür, 1913
Ophthalmitis siniherbida Wehrli, 1943
Ophthalmitis specificaria Bryk, 1948
Ophthalmitis striatifera Hampson, 1902
Ophthalmitis subpicaria Leech, 1897
Ophthalmitis suppressaria Walker, 1866
Ophthalmitis variegata Holloway, 1993
Ophthalmitis viridior Holloway, 1993
Ophthalmitis xanthypochlora Wehrli, 1924

References

Boarmiini